The 2021 Colonial Athletic Association baseball tournament was held at Brooks Field in Wilmington, North Carolina, from May 25 through 30. The Northeastern Huskies won the tournament, their first CAA victory, and earned the Colonial Athletic Association's automatic bid to the 2021 NCAA Division I baseball tournament.

Entering the event, two-time defending champion UNC Wilmington had won the most championships among active teams, with six.  James Madison and William & Mary had claimed two titles, while College of Charleston, Delaware, and Towson each had one.  Former member East Carolina won 7 titles during their tenure in the conference.

The 2020 Tournament was cancelled due to the COVID-19 pandemic, and so no champion was crowned.

Seeding and format
The CAA Tournament operates under a double-elimination format.

Tournament

References

Tournament
Colonial Athletic Association Baseball Tournament
Colonial Athletic Association baseball tournament
Colonial Athletic Association baseball tournament
College baseball tournaments in North Carolina
Baseball competitions in Wilmington, North Carolina